The 1840 United States presidential election in Kentucky took place between October 30 and December 2, 1840, as part of the 1840 United States presidential election. Voters chose 15 representatives, or electors to the Electoral College, who voted for President and Vice President.

Kentucky voted for the Whig candidate, William Henry Harrison, over Democratic candidate Martin Van Buren. Harrison won Kentucky by a margin of 28.4%.

With 64.20% of the popular vote, Kentucky would prove to be Harrison's strongest state in the 1840 election.

Results

References

Kentucky
1840
1840 Kentucky elections